Ringo R-470 was a Brazilian clone of the Sinclair ZX81 by Ritas do Brasil Ltda. introduced in 1983. It featured a Z80A processor at 3.25 MHz, 8K ROM and 16 KB RAM. It wasn't 100% compatible with the ZX81, and some BASIC tokens have alternate codings.

The machine had a price of Cr$449,950, higher than competitor computers like the TK85 that costed Cr$369,850, and it was not successful.

This computer can be emulated on modern systems under EightyOne Sinclair Emulator or MAME.

Keywords and Symbols 
BASIC keywords and character mapping are slightly altered on Ringo R-470 compared to the ZX81. Entry is still accomplished per keyword token, obtained using diferent cursor modes and key combinations, but these are diferent from the ZX81. The following table shows the supported BASIC keyword tokens and symbols, and the key combinations needed to enter them.

References 

Computers designed in Brazil
Goods manufactured in Brazil
Z80-based home computers
Sinclair ZX81 clones